Osama Hadid Thuwaini Al-Mukhaini commonly known as Osama Hadid (born 30 January 1987) is an Omani footballer who plays for Al-Seeb Club.

Club career
On 23 June 2013, he signed a contract with Al-Seeb Club.

Club career statistics

International career
Osama was selected for the national team for the first time in 2009. He made his first appearance for Oman on 20 January 2010 in a friendly match against Sweden. He has made appearances in the 2010 Gulf Cup of Nations and has represented the national team in the 2011 AFC Asian Cup qualification.

National team career statistics

Goals for Senior National Team
Scores and results list Oman's goal tally first.

Honours

Club
With Al-Seeb
Oman Professional League Cup (0): Runner-up 2013

References

External links

Osama Hadid Al-Mukhaini - GOAL.com
Osama Hadid Al-Mukhaini - GOALZZ.com
Osama Hadid Al-Mukhaini - KOOORA.com

1987 births
Living people
Omani footballers
Oman international footballers
Association football forwards
Al-Tali'aa SC players
Saham SC players
Al-Seeb Club players
Oman Professional League players